Redtop – also spelled Red Top – is a historic Shingle Style house located at 90 Somerset Street, Belmont, Massachusetts.  It was designated a National Historic Landmark in 1971 for its association with writer and literary critic William Dean Howells (1837–1920), a leading proponent of realism in literature.  The Shingle Style house was designed by Howells' brother-in-law William Rutherford Mead, and served as the Howells' residence from its construction in 1877 to 1882.

History
The summer house was designed by William Rutherford Mead, brother of Mrs. (Elinor Mead) Howells, and a partner in the architectural firm of McKim, Mead & Bigelow. The following year Stanford White joined the firm, and it was renamed McKim, Mead & White. The house was originally roofed with red-stained wood shingles, hence the name "Redtop". The family discarded other naming ideas including "Sub-Hub," "Monte Rose," "The Parlor Car," and "The Spindles." The owner of the new house was, in fact, Charles Fairchild (1838–1910), a Boston financier, who rented it to the Howellses. But it was designed from the start for the Howellses' taste, with Mead's partner, Charles Follen McKim becoming more and more involved. Construction began in 1877, and the Howellses moved in on July 8, 1878. By 1885, the Howellses had moved to Beacon Hill in Boston, in part due to family illness, including that of Elinor Howells.

Howells experienced great literary success during his time at "Redtop." By the end of the 1880s, he had published nine novels, a novella, several magazine articles, and a few plays. At "Redtop," he worked in an elegant white-paneled study with a carved inglenook for naps. Here, he completed The Lady of The Aroostook (1879) and The Undiscovered Country (1880) and began writing A Woman's Reason (1883). He began The Rise of Silas Lapham in England, and completed it in 1885 while living at 302 Beacon Street in Boston.

Several other American authors visited "Redtop" during the period when the Howells family lived there. To judge from published letters, Mark Twain visited "Redtop" eight times. Other visitors included Thomas Bailey Aldrich, Henry Wadsworth Longfellow, Henry James, and Charles Dudley Warner.

Location and design
The house sits on a large lot high atop Belmont Hill, looking out over Cambridge and Boston. It is built of brick and was originally clad in wood shingles in the Queen Anne style, with a large, sloping roof dominating the house as seen from the road beneath. The red roof that gave the house its nickname is now covered in gray shingles. The exterior walls were later stripped of their wood shingles and covered with stucco.

Novelist Henry James described the house as a "fairy abode of light and beauty" on its "cheerful, breezy hill . . . I never saw a house that took my fancy more captive at once by its tone of colour—as soon as I had entered the door; and every subsequent impression deepened the effect. All the details struck me as purely lovely, and when I looked from within outwards and over that incomparable landscape . . . I said to myself, 'Well, good fortune can no further go. Let silence muse the amount of it!' "

Mead's architectural designs for "Redtop" are preserved in the Amherst College Archives.

See also 
 William Dean Howells House (Cambridge, Massachusetts) 
 List of National Historic Landmarks in Massachusetts
 National Register of Historic Places listings in Middlesex County, Massachusetts

References

Further reading
 Ginette de B Merrill, Redtop and the Belmont years of W.D. Howells and his family, Harvard University Library, 1980, ASIN B0006XIPGC.
 William Dean Howells, My Mark Twain: Reminiscences and Criticisms, ed. Marilyn Austin Baldwin, Louisiana State University Press, 1967, page 173, footnote 62. . 
 Van Wyck Brooks, Howells: His Life and World, Dutton, 1959, page 128.
 Henry James, William Dean Howells, Letters, Fictions, Lives: Henry James and William Dean Howells, Oxford University Press, 1997, page 130, footnote 6. .

External links
 National Historic Landmark citation

National Historic Landmarks in Massachusetts
Belmont, Massachusetts
Houses completed in 1878
Shingle Style houses
Houses on the National Register of Historic Places in Middlesex County, Massachusetts
McKim, Mead & White buildings
Shingle Style architecture in Massachusetts